The greater Pittsburgh area is home to several colleges and universities listed in order of size, below:

Non-profit colleges and universities
Ranked in order of size:

For-profit colleges and universities

Theological seminaries
 Pittsburgh Theological Seminary
 Reformed Presbyterian Theological Seminary
 Trinity School for Ministry
 Byzantine Catholic Seminary of SS. Cyril and Methodius
 St. Paul Seminary

Art and culinary schools
 Art Institute of Pittsburgh
 Pittsburgh Filmmakers' School of Film, Photography, and Digital Media
 American Academy of Culinary Arts (AACA)

References

External links
 The College Board Pittsburgh Colleges & Universities

Universities and colleges in Pittsburgh
Colleges
Colleges
Pittsburgh